Renato Bustamante (born April 14, 1990) is a Peruvian professional footballer. Renato is the head coach of the College of the Sequoias men's team and holds a United States Soccer Federation National B Coaching License, Bachelor's Degree in Physical Education from Fresno Pacific University and is fluent in English, Spanish and Portuguese.

Playing Career 
Bustamante started playing college soccer at Truman College in 2012 where he was Team Captain, All Region and All American NJCAA  before transferring to Fresno Pacific University in 2013, where he was named the PacWest Conference Player of the Year and an All-American First Teamer in 2015. During his senior college year, Bustamante appeared for Premier Development League side Fresno Fuego.

Following college, Bustamante signed a professional contract with North American Soccer League side Tampa Bay Rowdies in April 2016, and spent the season on loan to their National Premier Soccer League affiliate Tampa Bay Rowdies 2.

In 2017, he rejoined Fresno Fuego and was named in the Premier Development League’s All-Western Conference team.

On January 19, 2018, Bustamante signed a contract with United Soccer League side Fresno FC ahead of their inaugural season. He made his debut on March 17, 2018 as a late substitute in a 2-3 loss to Las Vegas Lights, where he scored a late consolation goal.

ON January 17, 2022, Bustamante returned to the professional game by signing a contract with USL League One expansion club Central Valley Fuego FC.

Coaching Career 

Bustamante was named head coach of the College of the Sequoias Giants men's soccer team in January 2020. A program that averaged 4.5 wins a year in 13 seasons of existence. Bustamante turned the College of the Sequoias program around in his first year (2021) at the helm. In his first season, Bustamante accomplished feats never seen at College of the Sequoias Men's Soccer: Won a very tough Central Valley Conference, Won 10 regular season games, Made the State Playoffs, Advance to the second round by defeating the #2 and undefeated seed, Won coach of the year.  

Renato also served as a Director of Coaching of NPL Club South Valley United located in Visalia, California from November 2019 until December 2021.

Personal 
Bustamante was born in Lima, Peru, before moving to Chicago, Illinois in the United States when he was 12 years old.

References

External links 
 

1990 births
Living people
Truman Falcons men's soccer players
Fresno Pacific Sunbirds men's soccer players
Fresno Fuego players
Tampa Bay Rowdies players
Fresno FC players
Association football forwards
Sportspeople from Lima
USL League Two players
USL Championship players
Soccer players from Illinois
American soccer players
National Premier Soccer League players
Tampa Bay Rowdies 2 players
Central Valley Fuego FC players
College men's soccer coaches in the United States